João Francisco Nóbrega da Silva (born January 28, 1947 in Mangaratiba) is a former Brazilian football manager.

Honors
Vila Nova
 Campeonato Goiano:: 1977

Cruzeiro
 Campeonato Mineiro: 1984

Al-Arabi
 Sheikh Jassim Cup: 1982–83

Joinville
 Campeonato Catarinense: 1985

Vitória
 Campeonato Baiano: 1989, 1992

Criciúma
 Campeonato Catarinense: 1990

Bahia
 Campeonato Baiano:: 1993

Al-Shabab
 Crown Prince Cup: 1998–99

References

1947 births
Living people
Brazilian football managers
Campeonato Brasileiro Série A managers
Brazilian expatriate football managers
Expatriate football managers in Qatar
Expatriate football managers in the United Arab Emirates
Expatriate football managers in Saudi Arabia
América Futebol Clube (MG) managers
Vila Nova Futebol Clube managers
Cruzeiro Esporte Clube managers
Associação Atlética Caldense managers
Volta Redonda Futebol Clube managers
Associação Atlética Internacional (Limeira) managers
Bangu Atlético Clube managers
Madureira Esporte Clube managers
Al-Arabi SC (Qatar) managers
Villa Nova Atlético Clube managers
Joinville Esporte Clube managers
Al Ain FC managers
Goiás Esporte Clube managers
Esporte Clube Vitória managers
Fluminense de Feira Futebol Clube managers
Sport Club do Recife managers
Criciúma Esporte Clube managers
Paysandu Sport Club managers
União Recreativa dos Trabalhadores managers
Esporte Clube Bahia managers
Ettifaq FC managers
Clube do Remo managers
Al Shabab FC (Riyadh) managers
Uberlândia Esporte Clube managers
Nacional Futebol Clube managers
Ituano FC managers
Anápolis Futebol Clube managers